Krishnaveni or Krishna Veni may refer to:

 Krishna River, the third biggest river in India
 Krishnaveni (actress), Telugu actress, singer and producer
 Krishnaveni (film), a Telugu film about the life of a woman suffering from hysteria
 Jikki Krishnaveni, singer in South Indian films